Pethia reval, the red-finned barb, is a species of cyprinid fish endemic to Sri Lanka.  This species can reach a length of  SL.

Congener, Pethia cumingii, also a Sri Lankan endemic, has long been presumed to be dichromatic with some populations exhibiting yellow fins and others displaying red fins. In 2008, the red-finned populations were elevated to the status of species and given the name, Pethia reval, while the yellow-finned form remains P. cumingii. It is P. reval, the red-finned species, that has been kept most frequently by aquarists since the 1930s though identified as P. cumingii throughout the aquarium literature and aquarium trade until recently.

References 

Pethia
Taxa named by Madhava Meegaskumbura
Taxa named by Anjana Silva
Taxa named by Kalana Maduwage
Taxa named by Rohan Pethiyagoda
Fish described in 2008
Fish of Sri Lanka
Barbs (fish)